Ultramania is the second studio album by Korean musician Seo Taiji. Although it is the second solo album by Seo, some refer to it as his sixth counting the four albums released by Seo Taiji and Boys. The album, with its nu metal sound, has sold over a million copies, making it one of the best-selling albums in South Korea. Ultramania spawned three number-one singles, "Ultramania", "Feel the Soul" and "Internet War".

Background
Ultramania saw Seo Taiji resume musical activities in Korea for the first time since his retirement and the end of Seo Taiji and Boys in January 1996. Although he released Seo Tai Ji in 1998, he remained hidden and stayed in the United States. On his decision to end retirement and the fear of public opinion on his return, Seo said he thought it over many times and that it was not an easy decision to make. Awaiting his return, over a thousand fans waited at Kimpo International Airport in August 2000, with 900 policemen dispatched to control the chaos.

Seo held his "comeback" concert on September 9, 2000 at the Fencing Stadium within the Olympic Park to 6,000 fans. The album was released just one day earlier, with wholesalers estimating 800,000 to 900,000 copies sold in just two days.

He released the album's first single, "Ultramania", which quickly went to number one on the music charts. "Internet War" was soon to follow, also hitting number one. The final song on the album includes a hidden track; a rock version of "Neoege" originally from Seo Taiji and Boys' second album.

Most songs from Ultramania were re-recorded and released on the 2003 6th Album Re-recording & ETPFEST Live compilation.

Reception
Ultramania sold over 1.4 million copies. After Seo signed a deal to exclusively appear on Seoul Broadcasting System, its competitors Korean Broadcasting System and Munhwa Broadcasting Corporation left the musician off their music charts.

In 2000, the song "Ultramania" won the Mnet Asian Music Award for Best Band Performance.

Music critic Im Jin-mo said "Seo's new music is much more aggressive than before. It even shows signs of arrogance. It doesn't meet the traditional standard of popularity and commercialism. In a way, he seems to be making an 'independence declaration at a personal level."

Track listing

Personnel
Seo Taiji - vocals, all instruments, recording, producing
DJ Babu - scratching
Jason Robert - recording, mixing

References

External links

Seo Taiji albums
2000 albums